The Blades House, also known as the W.B. Blades House,  is an historic house located at 602 Middle Street, in New Bern, North Carolina, in the United States. Built in 1907 for lumber magnate William B. Blades, it was designed in the Queen Anne style by prolific local architect Herbert Woodley Simpson.  On January 14, 1972, it was added to the National Register of Historic Places.

See also
List of Registered Historic Places in North Carolina

References

External links
 National Register listings for Craven County
 New Bern Historical Society: first floor plan 
 New Bern Historical Society: second floor plan
 New Bern Historical Society: exterior photo
 New Bern Historical Society: another photo

Houses on the National Register of Historic Places in North Carolina
Queen Anne architecture in North Carolina
Houses completed in 1907
Houses in New Bern, North Carolina
National Register of Historic Places in Craven County, North Carolina